Sneha Shrestha (born 1 March 1995) is a national basketball player of Nepal. She started playing in national games since 2010. She participated in South Asian Basketball competition and also won a silver medal.

References

1995 births
Living people
Nepalese women's basketball players
Basketball players at the 2014 Asian Games
Asian Games competitors for Nepal
South Asian Games silver medalists for Nepal
South Asian Games medalists in basketball